Shrewsbury railway station is in Shrewsbury, Shropshire, England. Built in 1848, it was designated a grade II listed building in 1969.

Many services starting at or passing through the station are bound for Wales; it is operated by Transport for Wales, although the station is also served by Avanti West Coast and West Midlands Railway services, and is one of the key network hubs of Transport for Wales.

History
The station was formerly known as Shrewsbury General and is the only remaining railway station in the town; Shrewsbury Abbey, as well as other small stations around the town, having long closed.

Shrewsbury railway station was originally built in October 1848 for the county's first railway — the Shrewsbury to Chester Line. The architect was Thomas Mainwaring Penson of Oswestry. The building is unusual, in that the station was extended between 1899 and 1903 by the construction of a new floor underneath the original station building. The building style was imitation Tudor, complete with carvings of Tudor style heads around the window frames. This was done to match the Tudor building of Shrewsbury School (now Shrewsbury Library) almost directly opposite and uphill from the station. The station's platforms also extend over the River Severn. It was operated jointly by the Great Western Railway (GWR) and the London and North Western Railway (LNWR).

At Shrewsbury in steam days, the GWR regularly turned its locomotives by running round the triangle formed by using the Abbey Foregate loop, which links the Wolverhampton Line with the Welsh Marches Line and enables through running for freight trains, summer Saturday specials and formerly for trains like the Cambrian Coast Express. Until 1967 Shrewsbury was served by the GWR, latterly BR Western Region, express services between London Paddington and Birkenhead Woodside railway station.

The station was given Grade II listed status in May 1969; this applies to the main building on Castle Foregate, adjacent to platform 3.

Arwel Hughes composed Tydi a roddaist in 20 minutes during a wait between train connections in 1938. A plaque to mark this was unveiled on platform 3 in 2004.

Accidents and incidents 
On the 15 October 1907, a mail train hauled by Experiment class locomotive No. 2052 Stephenson was derailed at Shrewsbury due to excessive speed on a curve. Eighteen people were killed.
On the 6 November 2017, an Arriva Trains Wales Class 175 DMU, numbered 175109, caught fire, causing the station to be evacuated for approximately two hours. There were no casualties but significant travel disruption occurred.

Signalling

Severn Bridge Junction signal box, at the south east  end of the station and built by the LNWR, is the largest surviving mechanical signal box in the world, with a frame accommodating 180 levers, and is a listed building. Whilst the line beyond Abbey Foregate signal box to Wolverhampton has been updated to electronic signalling, Shrewsbury itself is set to remain lever operated for the foreseeable future. As a result of Shrewsbury's joint (GWR/LNWR) history, and having been transferred at different times between the Western and London Midland regions of BR and more recently Network Rail - it is now in the Great Western territory again - the signalling is a diverse mixture of lower-quadrant and upper-quadrant semaphore signals, with a few colour lights too. Crewe Junction, on the north end of the station, accommodates around 120 levers and is of the same design as Severn Bridge Junction.

The other Shrewsbury signal boxes are at Abbey Foregate (to a GWR design), controlling the eastern corner of the triangle and Sutton Bridge Junction where the Aberystwyth line diverges from the Hereford line (the now closed Severn Valley Railway to Bridgnorth and  also left the main line there).

Two other boxes at Crewe Bank and Harlescott Crossing (slightly further on towards Crewe) were both abolished (and subsequently removed) in October 2013, when the Crewe line had its signalling replaced by a new modular system controlled from the South Wales Rail Operating Centre in Cardiff. The former box had been "switched out" of use for several years previously and had been proposed for abolition by Network Rail back in 2009.

In autumn 2010 changes were made to allow Cambrian and Welsh Marches line trains to depart in a southerly direction from Platform 3. An upper quadrant signal replaced the previous shunting disc and a facing point lock was added to the points. Though the track layout could already accommodate this, until the lock was added only non-passenger movements southbound from Platform 3 could be made.Platforms and facilities
There are five platforms in use, numbered 3 to 7 (platforms 1 and 2 have been disused since the 1980s and have no track; around 2019 platform 2 was dismantled). Of these, platforms 4, 5, 6 and 7 are grouped on a main island, while platforms 1, 2 and 3 are separate, located by the main station building. The platforms are numbered in order from west (Shrewsbury Castle side) to east (The Dana side) from 1 to 7.

Platform 3 was until recently only used by trains running in from the Wolverhampton direction and out towards Chester. Changes made in 2010 to the signalling and track now allow additional passenger trains (those coming in from and going out to the Hereford, Heart of Wales and Cambrian lines) to use platform 3. A passenger lift was opened on the platform in 2009 and a waiting room opened shortly after. A lift has also been built for access to platforms 4–7, making the station fully accessible for wheelchair and mobility-impaired users.

Platforms 5 and 6 are bay platforms, used mainly for trains to and from Aberystwyth and Birmingham, as well as trains for the Heart of Wales Line and local stopping trains to Birmingham New Street.

The island platforms are connected to the main station building and platform 3 by a pedestrian subway running underneath the station. A pedestrian footbridge over the platforms still exists but has long been disconnected from the station; instead, it is a public walkway allowing pedestrians to cross over the station area, and part of a route named "The Dana". All platforms are fitted with CIS screens and automatic announcement speakers and there are customer help points on platforms 3 and 4. Ticket gates are in operation, with the ticket office here staffed throughout the week (Monday - Friday 05:20 - 20:40, Saturday 05:20 - 19:30, Sunday 07:30 - 19:30). Ticket machines are available for use when this is closed and for collecting pre-paid tickets. A buffet, toilets, and vending machines selling snacks and drinks are sited between platforms 4 and 7.

Opposite platform 7 is a high concrete wall that divides the rest of the station from what could be considered to be platform 8. This platform does not see any use and was built for the use of transporting prisoners from HM Prison Shrewsbury. (The prison gateway, surmounted by bust of prison reformer John Howard, is visible from platform 7.) It is believed that this platform was only used a few times each year between 1868 up until just before the First World War.

Station usage
According to the Office of Rail Regulation statistics for the 2011/12 financial year, the total number of entries and exits at the station was 1,730,390 (based on tickets sold at Shrewsbury, and tickets sold to Shrewsbury); with an estimated 205,148 passengers interchanging between services. This makes Shrewsbury the 14th busiest in the West Midlands region and the 6th busiest on the Transport for Wales network.

Services

Transport for Wales
 Alternate hourly service from Holyhead via Chester and Wrexham General to Birmingham International or Cardiff Central.
 Two-hourly services from Aberystwyth and Pwllheli via the Cambrian Line to Birmingham International which merge at Machynlleth.  Some additional Aberystwyth trains start and finish here at certain times of day. Some late evening services also terminate at Machynlleth.
 Hourly services from Manchester Piccadilly to  via the Welsh Marches Line. Some services terminate at Tenby, Maesteg or Pembroke Dock. There is also a two-hourly local stopping service to Crewe on this route.
 Services via the Heart of Wales Line to Swansea.  Five trains per day each way Monday–Saturday (plus two services to  except Saturdays) and two trains each way on Sundays.  
 Locomotive-hauled Premier Service between Holyhead and Cardiff Central via Chester. Three trains each way per day.
 Local Stopping services to Wrexham General (morning & late evening only)
All of the services above are operated by Class 150s, Class 153s, Class 158s or Class 175s, except the Premier Service which is operated by a Class 67 and Mark 4 coaching stock.

West Midlands Railway
 Hourly stopping service to Birmingham New Street, operated by a Class 170 or a Class 196, from Monday to Sunday

Avanti West Coast

See also
Listed buildings in Shrewsbury (southeast central area)
Shrewsbury Traction Maintenance Depot
Railways of Shropshire

References

Further reading

External links

Signalling around Shrewsbury station
Abbey Foregate Junction
Crewe Bank signal box
Crewe Junction signal box
Harlescott Crossing
Severn Bridge Junction signal box
Sutton Bridge Junction
Shrewsbury station on navigable 1946 O.S. map
 Grade II listing entry

Buildings and structures in Shrewsbury
Railway stations in Shropshire
DfT Category C1 stations
Former Shrewsbury and Hereford Railway stations
Former Shrewsbury and Wellington Joint Railway stations
Railway stations in Great Britain opened in 1848
Railway stations served by Transport for Wales Rail
Railway stations served by West Midlands Trains
Grade II listed railway stations
Grade II listed buildings in Shropshire
Thomas Mainwaring Penson railway stations
1848 establishments in England
Railway stations served by Avanti West Coast